Soni Mustivar (born 12 February 1990) is a professional footballer who plays as a midfielder for Championnat National 3 club Gueugnon. Born in France, he plays for the Haiti national team.

Club career 
Born Aubervilliers, France, Soni was trained at the Centre de Formation de Football de Paris, commonly called CFFP, in the heart of Paris before moving to his hometown club Aubervilliers. Following a stint there, he headed to the island of Corsica and joined Ligue 2 club Bastia. Due to injuries, he was called up to the first team for during 2008–09 season in Ligue 2. He made his professional debut on 29 August against Tours, coming on as a substitute in the 35th minute for the injured Hassoun Camara. He played the rest of the match as Bastia secured a 1–0 victory with a goal from Pierre-Yves André. He made five straight substitute appearances in the league before making his first start 1 May against Vannes in a 3–1 win. Ironically, he was substituted out in the 35th minute, due to an injury, and replaced by Hassoun Camara. In between those appearances, he had two solid starts in the Coupe de la Ligue against Strasbourg and Châteauroux.

On 27 March 2018, Azerbaijani club Neftçi announced the signing of Mustivar on a contract until the summer of 2019. After extending his contract with Neftçi for an additional year in the summer of 2019, Mustivar left the club on 19 June 2020 after his contract expired.

In January 2022, Mustivar signed for French club Entente SSG. In July 2022, he joined Gueugnon.

International career
Soni has earned caps with the France under-16 team, but went unnoticed during his development years. On 25 May 2009, he was selected to the under-20 squad to participate in the 2009 Mediterranean Games.

In 2013, Mustivar made his Haiti debut in a 4–1 loss to South Korea.

Career statistics

Club

International
Scores and results list Haiti's goal tally first, score column indicates score after each Mustivar goal.

Honours
Petrolul Ploiești
Romanian Cup: 2012–13
Sporting Kansas City
Lamar Hunt U.S. Open Cup: 2015, 2017

References

External links
 LFP Profile

Sportspeople from Aubervilliers
1990 births
Living people
French footballers
French sportspeople of Haitian descent
France youth international footballers
Citizens of Haiti through descent
Haitian footballers
Haiti international footballers
Association football midfielders
US Orléans players
SC Bastia players
FC Petrolul Ploiești players
Sporting Kansas City players
Neftçi PFK players
FC Hermannstadt players
Nea Salamis Famagusta FC players
Entente SSG players
FC Gueugnon players
Ligue 2 players
Championnat National players
Liga I players
Major League Soccer players
Azerbaijan Premier League players
Competitors at the 2009 Mediterranean Games
2014 Caribbean Cup players
Copa América Centenario players
Haitian expatriate footballers
Haitian expatriate sportspeople in Romania
Expatriate footballers in Romania
Expatriate soccer players in the United States
Haitian expatriate sportspeople in Azerbaijan
Expatriate footballers in Azerbaijan
Mediterranean Games competitors for France
Footballers from Seine-Saint-Denis